Duncan van Haaren is a Dutch Paralympic swimmer.

He represented the Netherlands at the 2016 Summer Paralympics in Rio de Janeiro, Brazil and he won the bronze medal in the men's 100 metre breaststroke SB9 event. He also competed in the men's 200 metre individual medley SM10 and men's 4 × 100 metre medley relay 34pts events.

References

External links 
 

Living people
Year of birth missing (living people)
Place of birth missing (living people)
Swimmers at the 2016 Summer Paralympics
Paralympic bronze medalists for the Netherlands
Paralympic medalists in swimming
Dutch male breaststroke swimmers
Dutch male medley swimmers
Paralympic swimmers of the Netherlands
Medalists at the 2016 Summer Paralympics
S10-classified Paralympic swimmers